2017 Emmy Awards may refer to:

 69th Primetime Emmy Awards, the 2017 Emmy Awards ceremony honoring primetime programming during June 2016 – May 2017
 44th Daytime Emmy Awards, the 2017 Emmy Awards ceremony honoring daytime programming during 2016
 45th International Emmy Awards, the 2017 ceremony honoring international programming

Emmy Award ceremonies by year